Two human polls made up the 1998–99 NCAA Division I men's ice hockey rankings, the USCHO.com/CBS College Sports poll and the USA Today/American Hockey Magazine Coaches Poll. As the 1998–99 season progressed, rankings were updated weekly. There were a total of 10 voters in the USA Today poll and 30 voters in the USCHO.com poll. Each first place vote is worth 10 points in the rankings with every subsequent vote worth 1 point less.

Legend

USA Today/American Hockey Magazine Coaches Poll

USCHO.com/CBS College Sports

References

External links
USA Today/USA Hockey Magazine Men's College Hockey Poll
USCHO.com/CBS College Sports Division I Men's Poll

Rankings
College men's ice hockey rankings in the United States